Aphanius baeticus is a species of fish in the family Cyprinodontidae. It is endemic to a small part of Southern Spain, between the Gulf of Cadiz and Huelva.  Its natural habitats are rivers, estuarine waters, and coastal saline lagoons. It is threatened by habitat loss and by invasive species.

References

baeticus
Endemic fish of the Iberian Peninsula
Fish described in 2002
Taxonomy articles created by Polbot
Taxobox binomials not recognized by IUCN